Wayland station is a former railroad station in Wayland, Massachusetts. Originally operated by the Central Massachusetts Railroad, it was later part of the Boston and Maine Railroad. The MBTA subsidized service at the station beginning in 1965. It was closed in 1971 when service on the Central Mass Branch was terminated due to poor track conditions.

References

External links

MBTA Commuter Rail stations in Middlesex County, Massachusetts
Former MBTA stations in Massachusetts
Wayland, Massachusetts
Railway stations in the United States opened in 1881
Railway stations closed in 1971
1971 disestablishments in Massachusetts
1881 establishments in Massachusetts